Arvīds Martins Petersons (24 October 1913 – 8 June 1985) was a Latvian ice hockey player. He played for HK ASK Rīga, Rīgas US, and Dinamo Riga during his career. Petersons also played for the Latvian national team at the 1936 Winter Olympics and three World Championships.

References

External links

1913 births
1985 deaths
Ice hockey players at the 1936 Winter Olympics
Latvian ice hockey forwards
Olympic ice hockey players of Latvia
People from the Governorate of Livonia
Ice hockey people from Riga
University of Latvia alumni